Bihariganj is one of the administrative divisions of Madhepura district in the Indian state of  Bihar.  The block headquarters, Bihariganj,  is located at a distance of 41 km from the district headquarters, namely, Madhepura. It is one of the main markets and is connected with neighbouring district Purnia by road and railways.

Geography

Panchayats
Panchayats in Bihariganj community development block are: Pararia, Rajganj, Mohanpur, Gamail, Lakshmipur lalchand, Madhukarchak, Bhabangama, Shekpura, Tulsia, Kusthan, Bihariganj and Hathiaundha.

Demographics
In the 2001 census Bihariganj Block had a population of 101,655. Bihariganj has 12 Mukhiya & 17 Panchyat samity sadasya.

See also
 Bihariganj

References

Community development blocks in Madhepura district